Jazireh may refer to:

 Jazireh Rural District, the administrative subdivision of East Azerbaijan Province
 Jazireh-ye Jonubi, a village in Bushehr Province 
 Jazireh-ye Shomali, a village in Bushehr Province